Noel Berkeley (born 20 December 1964) is an Irish long-distance runner. He competed in the men's 10,000 metres at the 1992 Summer Olympics.

References

External links
 

1964 births
Living people
Athletes (track and field) at the 1992 Summer Olympics
Irish male long-distance runners
Olympic athletes of Ireland
Place of birth missing (living people)